James or Jim Corbett may refer to:

Sports
James J. Corbett (1866–1933), a.k.a. "Gentleman Jim", American heavyweight champion in boxing
Jim Corbett (athletic director) (1919–1967), American athletics director at LSU, first president of the NACDA, namesake of Corbett Award
James Corbett (American football) (born 1955), American football player
Jimmy Corbett (born 1980), English footballer
James Corbett (author) (born 1978), English author, wrote histories of English football

Other
Jim Corbett (Edward James Corbett, 1875–1955), British hunter, conservationist, and author, Man-Eaters of Kumaon
Jim Corbett National Park, a wildlife reserve in India named after the British hunter
James A. Corbett (1933–2001), American rancher, writer, and human rights activist
James Corbett (politician) (1908–2005), Australian Country Party politician
Jim Corbett (politician) (1924–2007), U.S. politician
James W. Corbett (1928–1994), American physicist
James Francis Corbett (1834–1912), Australian Roman Catholic bishop of Sale, Victoria

See also
James Corbitt (1913–1950), known as 'Tish', friend of and eventually executed by Albert Pierrepoint